Iberville  may refer to:

Person
 Pierre Le Moyne d'Iberville, French explorer and colonist, founder of Louisiana

Electoral districts in Canada
 Iberville (Manitoba provincial electoral district)
 Iberville (Quebec provincial electoral district)
 Iberville (electoral district), federal electoral district
 Saint-Jean—Iberville—Napierville, federal electoral district
 St. Johns—Iberville—Napierville, federal electoral district
 St. Johns—Iberville, federal electoral district

Other
 Iberville Parish, Louisiana, USA
 Iberville Projects, a neighbourhood of New Orleans, USA
 Iberville River, historical name of Bayou Manchac in Louisiana
 Iberville, Quebec
 SS Iberville, multiple ships